Newport Country Club,  is a historic private golf club in the northeastern United States, located in Newport, Rhode Island. Founded  in 1893, it hosted both the first U.S. Amateur Championship and the first U.S. Open in 1895.

History
Theodore Havemeyer, a wealthy sportsman whose family owned the American Sugar Company, played the game of golf on a trip to Pau in the south of France in 1889 and returned to his summer home in Newport excited about its future.  In 1890, he and his friends rented some property on the old Castle Hill Farm and played golf on a primitive course.  He convinced a few pals from the summer colony's social elite, men such as John Jacob Astor IV, Perry Belmont, and  - to purchase the  Rocky Farm property for $80,000 and establish the golf club in 1893.

At the time of the club's founding, Newport was at the peak of its prestige as the favorite summer colony of America's wealthy elite.  The city had thus established one of America's earliest golf clubs since the sport was played almost exclusively by the rich when it was first introduced to the United States. The primitive course that they played upon in 1890 was bought roughly thirty years later and is now the site of seven holes (2–8) of the front nine.

Tournaments
Anxious to host national competitions, Havemeyer invited the country's best amateurs to his new course for a championship in 1894. That December, Havemeyer held a meeting at New York City's Calumet Club with representatives from four other clubs: St. Andrew's Golf Club in Hastings-on-Hudson, NY; Shinnecock Hills Golf Club in Southampton on Long Island, New York; The Country Club in Brookline, MA; and the Chicago Golf Club. These clubs agreed to form the Amateur Golf Association, the forerunner of the United States Golf Association (USGA).

In October 1895, Newport Country Club hosted both the first U.S. Amateur Championship and the first U.S. Open. To this day, the U.S. Amateur champion is awarded the Havemeyer Trophy.

In celebration of the centennial of those first two USGA events, the club hosted the U.S. Amateur in 1995,  won by defending champion Tiger Woods. Eleven years later, it was the site of the U.S. Women's Open in 2006, won by Annika Sörenstam in an 18-hole  In 2017, the USGA announced Newport will host the 41st U.S. Senior Open in June 2020 but after a pandemic cancelled all age-specific tournaments on the USGA calendar, the event was deferred to 2024.

Clubhouse
Whitney Warren designed the classic, Beaux Arts style clubhouse on a largely barren farm overlooking Brenton Point in 1895. It went under extensive renovation by Kirby Perkins Construction in 2005.

Warren's only other major Newport project at the time was a home for his sister, Edith, High Tide. This mansion, which overlooks Bailey's Beach and completed in 1900, and hosted Michelle Wie for the week of the 2006 U.S. Women's Open.

Course
The original nine-hole course was designed in 1894 by William "Willie" Davis, the club's first professional, and later expanded to 18 holes in 1899, again by Davis. This second nine was long thought to be designed by Donald Ross, but a recent discovery (2013) of an original scorecard (1899) refuted this.  This information is in the recently written club history.

A. W. Tillinghast, famous for such designs as Winged Foot, Baltusrol, Bethpage Black, and the San Francisco Golf Club, was hired in 1923 to remodel the course layout. Since 1995, restoration on some of the course has been completed by Ron Forse.

Scorecard

References

See also

Brenton Point

1893 establishments in Rhode Island
Buildings and structures in Newport, Rhode Island
Golf clubs and courses in Rhode Island
Golf clubs and courses designed by A. W. Tillinghast
Sports venues completed in 1893
Tourist attractions in Newport, Rhode Island
U.S. Open (golf) venues
Golf clubs and courses designed by William Davis (golfer)